Ephraim Todd Ellis (born February 23, 1985) is a Canadian actor. He is best known for playing Rick Murray on Degrassi: The Next Generation and Danny Ellis on Falcon Beach.

Early life 
Ephraim Ellis was born in Toronto, Ontario on February 23, 1985. His mother is an artist and jeweler, while his father is a visual artist and former stage manager for The Second City in Toronto.

Ephraim began acting while studying at Earl Haig Secondary School in Toronto, Ontario as part of the Claude Watson School of the Arts program. Ephraim attended Earl Haig at the same time as fellow Degrassi co-stars Jake Epstein and John Bregar.

Career 
Ephraim Ellis' first television role was an eight episode arc during seasons three and four of Degrassi: The Next Generation. He played Rick Murray, the character who famously shot and paralyzed Jimmy Brooks, the character played by Aubrey 'Drake' Graham.

After appearing on Degrassi, Ephraim appeared on such varied television shows such as Naturally Sadie, Wild Card, and Sue Thomas, F.B.Eye before landing the series lead role of Danny Ellis in the Global Television / ABC Family drama series Falcon Beach."Family hits ‘Beach’" by Tamsen Tillson at variety.com Falcon Beach ran for two seasons until 2006, when it was cancelled as a result of ABC Family's decision to decline bringing the series back for a third season.

Concurrently with Falcon Beach, Ephraim also appeared as Riley Kineston in seasons two and three of the YTV sci-fi series Zixx, as Dylan in seasons four and five of the APTN series renegadepress.com, and in the Canadian Film Centre's short feature White Out, which premiered at the Toronto International Film Festival.

Soon afterwards, Ephraim played the role of Eli Keller on the YTV sitcom Family Biz which filmed in Ottawa during the summer of 2008.

In 2009, Ephraim appeared in the Canadian Film Center horror/comedy web-series Seth On Survival as the title character, supernatural survivologist Seth Greening. In 2011, the series spawned a spin-off web-series, Your Lupine Life, where Ephraim reprised the role of Seth, as well as writing the episode in which he appeared. As a tie-in to the two web-series, Ephraim also wrote and published a book, Archie Hartigan & The Frost Wolf, a young adult fiction novel set in the same universe as Seth On Survival and Your Lupine Life.

Ephraim appeared in several episodes of season four of Murdoch Mysteries, as Toronto Gazette reporter Paddy Glynn.

From 2011 to 2016, Ephraim was a member of the Toronto sketch comedy troupe The Rocket Scientists alongside Brandon Hackett, Kevin MacNeil, and Chris Small.

Ephraim appeared alongside Minnie Driver and Meat Loaf in the 2014 horror/musical/comedy film Stage Fright. Later that year, Ephraim took on the role of Hedwig in the Lower Ossington Theatre's production of Hedwig & the Angry Inch, in a performance Toronto's Now Magazine said "achieves emotional depth, telling stories of love and betrayal, revealing a poignant loneliness beneath the makeup, sparkly costumes and iconic blond wig," and that "Ellis has the manic energy and singing chops to deliver in this difficult role." Ephraim later returned to the Lower Ossington for Legally Blonde and two productions of Jesus Christ Superstar.

Ephraim continued to make forays into the world of Ontario theatre in productions of Perfect Wedding at the Lighthouse Festival Theatre in Port Dover, Barefoot In The Park at Upper Canada Playhouse, and The Money Tree for Toronto's Roseneath Theatre for Young Audiences.

In 2018, Ephraim reunited with his Degrassi co-stars to appear in the music video for Drake's single "I'm Upset", reprising his role as Rick Murray.

Personal life 
Ephraim lives in Toronto, Ontario with his wife (a stage manager), and their cat.

Filmography

Film

Television

Theatre

Radio

References

External links
 
Ephraim Ellis on TTDb

1985 births
21st-century Canadian male actors
Male actors from Toronto
Canadian male film actors
Canadian male television actors
Canadian male voice actors
Living people